= Crown of Arthain =

1980 video game

- Publisher: Micro Lab
- Platform: Apple II
- Release: 1980

Crown of Arthain is a video game for the Apple II published in 1980 by Micro Lab.

== Contents ==
Crown of Arthain is a two-player fantasy game in which the players are two princes who will need to find and search a dungeon for their father's crown.

== Reception ==
John Morrison reviewed Crown of Arthain in The Space Gamer No. 49. Morrison commented that "Crown of Arthain would have made a fair two-player game if the monster frequency was reduced drastically. Also, the price is a tad high. As a one-player game it has nothing to recommend it. I recommend it as-is only to rich gamers who'll buy anything."
